Ralph Summers Plaisted (September 30, 1927 – September 8, 2008) was an American explorer who, with his three companions, Walt Pederson, Gerry Pitzl and Jean-Luc Bombardier, are regarded by most polar authorities to be the first to succeed in a surface traverse across the ice to the North Pole on April 19, 1968, making the first confirmed surface conquest of the Pole.

Background

Plaisted was a high-school dropout from Bruno, Minnesota, who found success as an insurance salesman. An avid outdoorsman, in the early 1960s he was one of the first Minnesotans to buy a Ski-Doo snowmobile, a then-novel invention of Canada's Bombardier Company, and became a convert and promoter of the machine. In 1965, Plaisted drove his snowmobile  from Ely to White Bear Lake, Minnesota in one day, which is regarded as the first long-distance snowmobile trek.

Arctic expedition
Plaisted and his friend Art Aufderheide conceived the idea of reaching the North Pole by snowmobile in the spring of 1966, aiming to make the trip the following year. Gordon Mikkelson (1929-1990) helped with snowmobiling and base camp logistics.    Customized clothing was assembled for the team, which they tested by sleeping on a frozen lake in northern Minnesota. In April and May 1967 Plaisted's first attempt was thwarted at 83° 20' latitude by storms and open water. The attempt resulted in a CBS-TV documentary To the Top of the World, reported by Charles Kuralt, who accompanied the Plaisted team.

Plaisted returned for a successful attempt the following year in March 1968. Starting at Canada's  Ward Hunt Island just a few miles from Peary's start at Cape Columbia on Ellesmere Island, Plaisted began the  traverse on March 9.

Navigating with a sextant and resupplied when possible with fuel and supplies dropped by a turboprop DeHavilland Twin Otter, the expedition members spent 43 days, 11 hours traveling on the ice before reaching their final camp on the evening of April 19. Navigator Jerry Pitzl made hourly sextant sightings over the next two days to confirm their location. At 10:30 am Eastern Daylight Time, the aircraft, call sign LARK-47, flew overhead confirming the party was exactly at the North Pole. The party was then flown out.

Given the doubts surrounding the North Pole conquest claims of Robert Peary and Frederick Cook, Ralph Plaisted's journey, the Plaisted Polar Expedition, is regarded as the first undisputed surface conquest of the North Pole. Affidavits signed by resupply pilots Welland Phipps and Ken Lee confirm that the expedition did not cover any distance by air.

See also 
 North Pole

References

External links
 Ralph Plaisted at National Archives and Records Administration
 
 
 
 
 
 
 
 
 
 
 
 
 
 
 
 
 Anthology of Arctic Reading: United States - What did explorers read?

Explorers of the Arctic
American polar explorers
1927 births
2008 deaths
People from Pine County, Minnesota